Lake Tobesofkee is a reservoir located on Tobesofkee Creek in Bibb County, Georgia. Built in the 1960s to control flooding, the lake soon became a site for public recreation and is known as one of the most heavily fished lakes in the state.

History
Between 1963 and 1967 the U.S. Soil Conservation Service and the Bibb County Commission built a series of dams on Tobesofkee Creek to form flood control reservoirs, including Lake Tobesofkee.  Locals often refer to the lake as either "Tobi" or "Tobo."

Facilities
Located three miles from I-475, Lake Tobesofkee Recreation Area has three public parks named Claystone, Sandy Beach, and Arrowhead. Besides facilities for fishing, camping, boating, and tennis, the parks have three white sand beaches for swimming or picnicking. Arrowhead Park includes several miles of singletrack mountain biking trails.

External links
Lake Tobesofkee Home Page 
Arrowhead Park Map
Claystone Park Map
Sandy Beach Map

Tobesofkee
Protected areas of Bibb County, Georgia
Bodies of water of Bibb County, Georgia